The Don is the fifth-longest river in Europe. Flowing from Central Russia to the Sea of Azov in Southern Russia, it is one of Russia's largest rivers and played an important role for traders from the Byzantine Empire.

Its basin is between the Dnieper basin to the west, the lower Volga basin immediately to the east, and the Oka basin (tributary of the Volga) to the north. Native to much of the basin were Slavic nomads.

The river's upper half ribbles (meanders subtly) south; however, its lower half consists of a great eastern curve, including Voronezh, making its final stretch, an estuary, run west south-west. The main city on the river is Rostov-on-Don. Its main tributary is the Seversky Donets, centred on the mid-eastern end of Ukraine, thus the other country in the overall basin. To the east of a series of three great ship locks and associated ponds is the  Volga-Don Canal.

History
According to the Kurgan hypothesis, the Volga-Don river region was the homeland of the Proto-Indo-Europeans around 4000 BC. The Don river functioned as a fertile cradle of civilization where the Neolithic farmer culture of the Near East fused with the hunter-gatherer culture of Siberian groups, resulting in the nomadic pastoralism of the Proto-Indo-Europeans. The east Slavic tribe of the Antes inhabited the Don and other areas of Southern and Central Russia. The area around the Don was influenced by the Byzantine Empire because the river was important for traders from Byzantium.

In antiquity, the river was viewed as the border between Europe and Asia by some ancient Greek geographers. In the Book of Jubilees, it is mentioned as being part of the border, beginning with its easternmost point up to its mouth, between the allotments of the sons of Noah, that of Japheth to the north and that of Shem to the south. During the times of the old Scythians it was known in Greek as the Tanaïs and has been a major trading route ever since. Tanais appears in ancient Greek sources as both the name of the river and of a city on it, situated in the Maeotian marshes. Greeks also called the river Iazartes.
Pliny gives the Scythian name of the Tanais as Silys.

According to an anonymous Greek source, which historically (but not certainly) has been attributed to Plutarch, the Don was home to the legendary Amazons of Greek mythology.

The area around the estuary has been speculated to be the source of the Black Death in the mid-14th century.

While the lower Don was well known to ancient geographers, its middle and upper reaches were not mapped with any accuracy before the gradual conquest of the area by Muscovy in the 16th century.

The Don Cossacks, who settled the fertile valley of the river in the 16th and 17th centuries, were named after the river.

The fort of Donkov was founded by the princes of Ryazan in the late 14th century. It is shown as Donko in Mercator's Atlas (1596). 
Donkov was again relocated in 1618, appearing as Donkagorod  in Joan Blaeu's map of 1645.

Both Blaeu and Mercator follow the 16th-century cartographic tradition of letting the Don originate in a great lake, labeled Resanskoy ozera by Blaeu. Mercator follows Giacomo Gastaldo (1551) in showing a waterway connecting this lake (by Gastaldo labeled Ioanis Lago, by Mercator Odoium lac. Iwanowo et Jeztoro) to Ryazan and the Oka River. Mercator shows Mtsensk (Msczene) as a great city on this waterway, suggesting a system of canals connecting the Don with the Zusha (Schat)  and Upa (Uppa) centered on a settlement Odoium, reported 
as Odoium lacum (Juanow ozero) in the map made by Baron Augustin von Mayerberg, leader of an embassy to Muscovy in 1661.

In modern literature, the Don region was featured in the work And Quiet Flows the Don by Mikhail Aleksandrovich Sholokhov, a Nobel-prize winning writer from the stanitsa of Veshenskaya.

Dams and canals
At its easternmost point, the Don comes within  of the Volga. The Volga-Don Canal, 101 kilometres (65 mi), connects the two. It is a broad, deep waterway capable of transporting oil tanker size vessels. It is one of two which enables ships to depart the Caspian Sea, the other, a series, connected to the Baltic Sea. The level of the Don where connected is raised by the Tsimlyansk Dam, forming the Tsimlyansk Reservoir.

This facility, with its dam, maintains a navigable head of water locally and into the lowermost stretch of the Seversky Donets. This is presently the last lock on the Don; below it, deep-draught navigation is maintained by dredging.

In order to improve shipping conditions in the lower reaches of the Don, the waterway authorities support plans for one or two more low dams with locks. These will be in  Bagayevsky District and possibly Aksaysky District.

Tributaries

Main tributaries from source to mouth:

Nepryadva
Krasivaya Mecha
Bystraya Sosna
Veduga
Voronezh
Tikhaya Sosna
Bityug
Osered
Chyornaya Kalitva
Khopyor – 
Medveditsa
Ilovlya
Chir
Seversky Donets – 
Aidar – 
Sal
Manych
Aksay
Temernik

See also
Don goat
And Quiet Flows the Don by Mikhail Sholokov
Rostov railway drawbridge

Footnotes

Explanatory

Sources

External links

 

 
Book of Jubilees
Geography of Southern Russia
Rivers of Lipetsk Oblast
Rivers of Rostov Oblast
Rivers of Tula Oblast
Rivers of Volgograd Oblast
Rivers of Voronezh Oblast